Middle Road Bridge is a covered bridge spanning Conneaut Creek in Conneaut, Ashtabula County, Ohio, United States.  The bridge, one of currently 16 drivable bridges in the county, is a single span Howe truss design.  Built in 1868, it was reconstructed in 1984 with the help of three volunteers and four college students.  The bridge’s WGCB number is 35-04-06, and it is located approximately 3.2 mi (5.1 km) south of downtown Conneaut. It is 136 feet (41.5 m) long.

Bridge runs from the Northwest to the Southeast.

Gallery

See also
List of Ashtabula County covered bridges

References

External links
Ohio Covered Bridges List
Ohio Covered Bridge Homepage
The Covered Bridge Numbering System
Ohio Historic Bridge Association
Middle Road Covered Bridge from Ohio Covered Bridges, Historic Bridges

Covered bridges in Ashtabula County, Ohio
Bridges completed in 1868
Road bridges in Ohio
Wooden bridges in Ohio
1868 establishments in Ohio